Haynes  may refer to:

People
Haynes (surname)

Places
In Australia:
 Haynes, Western Australia
In Canada:
 Haynes, Alberta
In the United Kingdom:
Haynes, Bedfordshire
Haynes Church End

In the United States:
Haynes, Arkansas
Haynes, North Dakota
Haynes, Ohio
Haynes Township, Michigan

Other uses
Haynes International, a US corporation specializing in corrosion-resistant metal alloys
Haynes Manuals, set of manuals for automobile repair and other do it yourself projects
Haynes Automobile Company, a defunct American automobile company
John C. Haynes & Co., a musical instrument maker
William S. Haynes Flute Company, American flute maker
Haynes v. United States, a United States Supreme Court decision
Haynes International Motor Museum, a motor museum in Sparkford, Somerset, England.

See also
Haine
Hayne
Haines (disambiguation)
Hanes
Hayes
Hawnes